Yothin Yaprajan (Thai: โยธิน ยาประจันทร์; born 8 May 1992) is a Thai middle-distance runner.

International competitions

Personal bests
Outdoor
800m - 1:51.30 (Bangkok 2013)
1500m - 3:49.35 (Singapore 2015)

Indoor
1500m - 3:59.82 (Ashgabat 2017)

References

All-Athletics profile

Living people
Yothin Yaprajan
Southeast Asian Games medalists in athletics
1992 births
Yothin Yaprajan
Athletes (track and field) at the 2018 Asian Games
Competitors at the 2013 Southeast Asian Games
Competitors at the 2015 Southeast Asian Games
Yothin Yaprajan
Competitors at the 2019 Southeast Asian Games
Yothin Yaprajan